K. R. Mangalam University, is a private university located in Gurugram district, India. The university was established in 2013 by the K. R. Mangalam Group through the Haryana Private Universities (Amendment) Act, 2013. The university is approved by the University Grants Commission (UGC) and is competent to award degrees as instructed by the UGC under section 22 of the UGC Act, 1956.

Campus 

The K.R. Mangalam University campus is located on Sohna Road, Gurugram, Haryana. The university is between the Aravalli Hills and is connected with the National Capital Region within proximity. Facilities at KRMU include a library, Amphitheatre classrooms, conference rooms, computer labs, an engineering kitchen, subsidized buses, and a Wi-Fi enabled campus.

K.R. Mangalam University has a separate girls' and boys' hostel with full-time security. The campus provides a designated area for extra-curricular activities, such as a football field, cricket pitch, badminton and tennis courts, an indoor sports area, theatre space, and more. The university also has a gym. The campus is fully secured under 24x7 camera surveillance and security guards. More than 15 buses provide transportation around the capital. KRMU also has an ambulance, doctor-on-call and fire engine to respond to emergencies.

Schools 
 School of Engineering & Technology
 School of Basic & Applied Science
 School of Journalism & Mass Communication
 School of Legal Studies
 School of Education
 School of Medical & Allied Sciences
 School of Management & Commerce
 School of Humanities
 School of Agricultural Science
 School of Hotel Management & Catering Technology
 School of Architecture and Design

Academics

Admission 
Admissions at K.R. Mangalam University are open from March to July every year. Applications are accepted in both online and offline formats. They are reviewed according to prior academic performance, their agility, and the candidate's suitability for the program they have applied for. If the candidate is found to be eligible, they are asked to appear for a written exam (either online or offline).

KRMU accepts CBSE, CISCE, NIOS and other recognized state boards. K.R. Mangalam University now accepts scores and percentiles achieved in JEE Main, CUET, NATA, CLAT, LSAT, Pearson Undergraduate Entrance Exam.

Academic Programmes 
The university has 11 schools and offers more than 60 undergraduate, postgraduate, doctoral and diploma programs in various disciplines, including Basic and Applied Science, Engineering, Pharmacy, Journalism and Mass Communication, Agricultural Science, Hotel Management, Humanities, and Education.

During the lockdown, the leading education institution survived the transition from offline to online education mode successfully. KRMU offers blended learning in collaboration with various institutions.

References

Private universities in India
Universities and colleges in Gurgaon
Universities in Haryana
Educational institutions established in 2013
2013 establishments in Haryana